The Willy Brandt School of Public Policy is a public institute for research and education in the field of public policy at the University of Erfurt. It was established in 2002, offering the first German study program leading to a Master of Public Policy (MPP) degree. The program has been accredited and reaccredited by ACQUIN. The working language is English. Until November 2009, the school was named Erfurt School of Public Policy (ESPP).

Concept
The Brandt School was designed according to the Anglo-American model, where education, teaching and research are organised jointly. In the area of public policy, the school offers advanced training at the Master's level, by combining knowledge and methods from different branches of the social sciences (economics, political science, public administration and management science, and sociology). With the help of references to professional praxis and relevant social problems, the Brandt School wants to help soften the borders of the individual sciences. As a result, students should be enabled to use interdisciplinary theory and methods in order to develop and work on problems from different angles and to develop individual skills relevant to their future careers. The Brandt School is particularly characterized by the internationality of its student body, its students are from more than dozens of countries.

Name

Willy Brandt was chosen as name giver for various reasons that connect to the city of Erfurt, his style of making politics and the focus of his politics. In 1970, Brandt visited Erfurt for the first German-German summit meeting and was enthusiastically cheered on by the local crowd. His contributions to the east–west and north–south dialogues have helped improve mutual understanding, and his modern, reform-oriented style serves as role model for the students.

Academic program
The Master of Public Policy (MPP) is an interdisciplinary, practice-orientated, two-year full-time program, conducted entirely in English. The program is intended for students from Germany and abroad, pursuing a future career dealing professionally with problems of modern governance in an executive, leading position. Possible work areas are in the public sector, international organizations, NGOs, politics and commercial enterprises. The MPP can be pursued immediately after the completion of a bachelor's degree, or on the basis of several years of professional experience.

Drawn from political science, economics, sociology, public administration and law, the MPP curriculum aims to equip students with tools and methods of policy analysis, development and implementation. Internships, project groups, practical training courses, and case studies add practical aspects to the program. Furthermore, students can choose to specialize in two of the following areas:
 European Public Policy
 International Affairs
 Public and Non-Profit Management
 International Political Economy
Alternatively, they can pursue a Conflict Studies and Management (CSMP) track within the MPP.

Research

In addition to the study program, the school is also engaged in research on public policy and governance. There are five research clusters available:

 Global Public Policy
 Development and Socio-Economic Policies
 Conflict Studies and Management
 Entrepreneurship and Public Policy
 Methods of Public Policy

A PhD program is being offered in all five research foci.

Partnerships
The Willy Brandt School is long-term institutional partner of both the Franz Haniel Foundation and the German Academic Exchange Service (DAAD).

The German Academic Exchange Service (DAAD) supports and sponsors different scholarships and programs, most notably the Helmut Schmidt Scholarship (previously Public Policy and Good Governance program). Between 2008 and 2011, the Brandt School was furthermore the exclusive host for the Good Governance in Afghanistan program in cooperation with the German Foreign Office and the DAAD. It was especially designed for young Afghans and aimed at equipping them for the challenges they face in rebuilding the Afghan political system. 36 participants graduated between 2011 and 2013.

The Haniel Foundation sponsors the Franz Haniel Chair of Public Policy, the Aletta Haniel Chair for Public Policy and Entrepreneurship, as well as the Gerhard Haniel Professorship für Public Policy and International Development. It provides several scholarships for Brandt School students from Eastern Europe/CIS and from Western Europe/North America, respectively. Furthermore, it supported the Haniel Spring Schools which took place in Russia and have covered topics such as "Public Administration - Russia in Comparative Perspectives," "Border Policies from the Soviet Union to the EU," and "The Effects of Center-Local Relationships of Public Policy."

Furthermore, the Willy Brandt School is supported by various project partners for practice-oriented teaching and is a member of several networks and consortiums.

Professors and Lecturers

The Brandt School's academic staff, amongst others, consists of Achim Kemmerling (Director), Heike Grimm (Deputy Director), Andreas Goldthau (Franz Haniel Professor for Public Policy), Patrick Mello, Pau Palop-García, as well as many of the professors of the Faculty of Social Sciences of the University of Erfurt.

References

External links 
 

University of Erfurt
Public policy schools
Educational institutions established in 2002
2002 establishments in Germany
Willy Brandt